Besal (Urdu: بیسل) is a small village located in Kaghan Valley, Mansehra District of Khyber Pakhtunkhwa province of Pakistan. It sits 3260 meters above sea level. It is adjacent to the Kunhar River, about 45 kilometers north of Naran. It is the starting point for hiking trails like Dudipatsar Trail. It is accessible by cars and motorbikes.

Gallery 

Mansehra District